The men's individual all-around at the European Men's Artistic Gymnastics Championships have been staged since 1955.

Medalists

Medal table

See also
 European Men's and Women's Artistic Gymnastics Individual Championships
 European Men's Artistic Gymnastics Championships
 World Artistic Gymnastics Championships

References 

European Artistic Gymnastics Championships
All-around artistic gymnastics